Moses Swaibu (born 9 May 1989) is an English former professional footballer who played as a defender.

During his career, Swaibu represented Lincoln City in the Football League, last playing for Whitehawk in 2013. He made a total of 165 league appearances, scoring four goals. In April 2015, he was sentenced to 16 months in prison for his role in a 2013 match fixing scandal.

Playing career

Crystal Palace
Schooled at The Archbishop Lanfranc School, Croydon, Swaibu joined the Crystal Palace academy at the age of 16 having been spotted playing for Croydon Schools and never having been previously associated with a professional club. Impressive progress in the academy saw him offered a professional contract at the culmination of his two-year scholarship, and awarded the Scholar of the Year and Vice-Presidents Young Player of the Year for the 2006–07 season.

Having signed a one-year professional contract with the club, he made the first team squad for the first time for the home game against Watford on 29 October 2007, where he was an unused substitute in a 2–0 defeat; the game though was notable for the Palace debut of the 15-year-old John Bostock.

In February 2008, Swaibu was loaned to Conference National side Weymouth, with Palace manager Neil Warnock hoping that the loan spell would improve his heading ability. Swaibu played a solitary game for Weymouth in the 2–1 defeat at Halifax Town on 1 March 2008 before returning to Selhurst Park. In May 2008, he was one of five players released by the club at the end of their contracts.

Lincoln City
Swaibu linked up with Bromley at the beginning of September 2008 on non-contract terms, debuting in the 2–2 home draw with Chelmsford City on 2 September 2008, and went on to make 20 league and cup appearances for the Lillywhites, during which he scored a horrific own-goal in the 3–3 draw with Thurrock. In January 2009, he commenced a trial with Lincoln City, and made his Football League debut for the club in the 1–1 draw at Morecambe on 10 February 2009. He scored his first goal for the club on 9 February 2010 during the 2–1 defeat away at Chesterfield, with an audacious chip from 20 yards. He went on to score twice more for the Imps. Having made 10 appearances that season, Swaibu was awarded the Young Player of the Year Award at the end of that season. After the club rejected a transfer bid from Birmingham City and Aston Villa he signed a new two-year deal under Peter Jackson. Moses went on and made over 60 appearances for the Imps in his two-year spell. He left Lincoln in January 2011 by mutual consent.

Kettering Town
Swaibu signed for Kettering Town on non-contract terms in October 2011. He left the club two months later, after making six appearances.

Bromley
In December 2011, he rejoined former club Bromley. On 27 April 2012, he signed a new deal with the club, keeping him there until the end of the 2012–13 season. He scored his first goal for the club in a 4–0 away win against Dorchester Town on 8 January 2013. He was not offered a new contract, and left the club at the end of the 2012–13 season.

Sutton United and Whitehawk
In July 2013 he agreed a three-month deal with Sutton United. He debuted for the club in their 4–1 Conference South victory over Staines Town on 20 August 2013 but made only one further appearance for the club before, at the beginning of September, he was released in order to find regular first team football. He quickly joined Whitehawk but left the club in November having failed to make the expected impact.

Match-fixing charge
In January 2014, Swaibu was charged with conspiracy to defraud, arising from an investigation into match fixing and an alleged betting syndicate. On 29 April 2015, Swaibu was found guilty at Birmingham Crown Court of conspiracy to commit bribery and jailed for sixteen months.

Honours
Bromley
London Senior Cup: 2012–13

References

External links

Lincoln City F.C. official archive profile

1989 births
Living people
Association football defenders
Bromley F.C. players
Crystal Palace F.C. players
English criminals
English Football League players
English footballers
Footballers from Islington (district)
Kettering Town F.C. players
Lincoln City F.C. players
National League (English football) players
Prisoners and detainees of England and Wales
Sutton United F.C. players
Weymouth F.C. players
Whitehawk F.C. players